This is a list of people associated with Bletchley Park, the principal centre of Allied code-breaking during the Second World War, notable either for their achievements there or elsewhere. Work at or for Bletchley Park is given first, followed by achievements elsewhere in parentheses.
 
 Sir Frank Ezra Adcock (Professor of Ancient History, Cambridge University)
 Alexander Aitken
 James Macrae Aitken, worked in Hut 6 (Scottish chess champion)
 Hugh Alexander, member of Hut 6 February 1940–March 1941, later head of Hut 8 (head of the cryptanalysis division at GCHQ; British Chess Champion 1938 and 1956)
 Maurice Allen, at the Wireless Experimental Centre, Delhi; an Oxford don. 
 Stanley Armitage
 Pamela Ascherson, bombe operator, (artist)
 Michael Arbuthnot Ashcroft (codebreaker)
 Arthur Oliver Lonsdale Atkin (mathematician)
 John H. A. Atkins (translator of Japanese, later Head of Modern Languages at Nottingham Trent University)
 Joyce Aylard, bombe operator at Eastcote, reassigned to Bletchley Park after VE day
 Dennis Babbage, chief cryptanalyst in Hut 6 (mathematician) 
 Sarah Baring, linguist in Hut 4 (socialite and memoirist)
 Jean Barker, Baroness Trumpington née Jean Alys Campbell-Harris
 J. W. B. Barns, worked in Hut 4, Hut 5 and Block A (Professor of Egyptology, Oxford University)
 Geoffrey Barraclough (Chichele Professor of Modern History, University of Oxford)
 Keith Batey
 Mavis Batey née Lever, cryptologist (garden and landscape historian, author, former President of the Garden History Society)
 Rodney Bax, an Intelligence Corps captain in the Fusion Room,Hut 3.
 Peter Benenson, worked in the "Testery" (founder of Amnesty International)
 Ralph Bennett, intelligence officer in Hut 3 (Professor of History at Magdalene College, Cambridge and president 1979-82)
 Osla Benning, linguist Hut 4
 Francis (Frank) Birch, Head of German Naval Section
 Judith Irene Bloomfield (Worked in Bletchley Park Mansion and Hut 8. Berkely Street) 
 T. S. R. Boase (art historian)
 Arthur Bonsall (Director of GCHQ)
 Ruth Bourne (née Henry), Bombe operator (in 2012 she was a volunteer guide at BP
 Edward Boyle, intelligence (Conservative politician)
 Captain A. R. Bradshaw, senior naval officer at BP and in overall charge of administration of BP  
 Charles Brasch: Italian section, in Elmers School building and London. New Zealand poet. 
 Hilary Brett or Brett-Smith, from Somerville College, Oxford, cryptologist, Hut 8 (Lady Hinsley)
 Lord Asa Briggs, member of the Watch in Hut 6 (historian)
 Jean Briggs Watters, English cryptanalyst
 Elsie Booker, Wren, in photo with Dorothy Du Boisson 
 Christine Brooke-Rose, from Somerville College, Oxford
 Tommy Brown, 16-year-old NAAFI canteen assistant who was awarded the George Medal for risking his life in helping Francis Fasson and Colin Grazier in recovering 'short signal' codebooks which provided a breakthrough in cryptanalysis of the German Naval Enigma from the sinking 
 Alan Bruce
 William Bundy, US Army Signal Corps (member of the CIA and foreign affairs advisor to Presidents John F. Kennedy and Lyndon B. Johnson)
 James Ramsay Montagu Butler (politician and historian)
 Elizabeth Byng
 John Cairncross, Soviet spy
 Peter Calvocoressi, intelligence officer (RAF)
 J. W. S. Cassels
 John Chadwick
 Caroline Chojecki MBE, intelligence database analyst (Soviet Studies Research Centre, Sandhurst database analyst)
 John Christie, codebreaker
 Joan Clarke (later Murray), mathematician (briefly engaged to Alan Turing)
 William Clarke, Head of Naval Section, then of Italian Naval subsection 
 Tom Colvill, general Manager of the Testery
 Arthur Cooper, British Foreign Office linguist (Chinese and Japanese), FECB then FRUMEL
 Josh Cooper, cryptographer
 Margaret Cooper (née Douglas)
 Michael Crum, worked on the Siemens and Halske T52 teleprinter cipher, codenamed "STURGEON"
 Alec Naylor Dakin (cryptographer) worked in hut 4 decrypted premature message about death of Hitler during German assassination attempt
 Dorrit Dekk, Czechoslovakian emigrant designer who joined the Wrens and worked as a 'listener' during the war
 Alexander "Alistair" Denniston, Deputy Director of GC&CS
 Nakdimon ("Naky") Doniach, RAF, linguist (later GCHQ and Oxford University)
 Dorothy Du Boisson, operator of the Colossus computer
 Peter Edgerley, codebreaker
 Peter Ericsson, Testery shift-leader, linguist and senior codebreaker
 Margaret "Peggy" Erskine-Tulloch née Seton, one of the first Wrens at Bletchley Park, was a Bombe operator, instructor and watch officer
 John Davies Evans
 Francis Anthony Blair Fasson, Lieutenant RN was posthumously awarded the George Cross for the "for outstanding bravery and steadfast devotion to duty in the face of danger" that he displayed on 30 October 1942 in boarding, with Able Seaman Colin Grazier, the sinking U-boat U-559 and recovering 'short signal' codebooks which provided a breakthrough in Cryptanalysis of the German Naval Enigma but losing his life in the process
 Jane Fawcett, was credited with identifying the message that led to the sinking of the battleship Bismarck, a great Allied naval victory 
 Harry Fensom, the creator of the British Tunny machine which was used in decoding messages in the Lorenz Cipher
 Michael Field, foreign correspondent for the Daily Telegraph for thirty years, living in South America, Southeast Asia and France 
 Harold Fletcher; Hut 6, involved in Bombe administration from August 1941
 Tommy Flowers, post office engineer and designer of the Colossus computer
 Leonard Forster
 Hugh Foss, cryptographer, head of the Japanese Naval Section (Hut 7) from 1942 to 1943
 Freddy (Frederick)  Freeborn, ran the Tabulating (index) Section in Block C (formerly Hut 7; former head of BTM's Letchworth factory. 
 Alfred Friendly, US Army Air Force (editor of the Washington Post)
 Joshua David Goldberg, Japanese codebreaker, solicitor
 Harry Golombek (chess player)
 I. J. (Jack) Good
 Raymond Goodman, head of one shift in Naval Intelligence under Frank Birch
 Valerie Glassborow, grandmother of Kate Middleton, Duchess of Cambridge, worked in Hut 16 along with her twin sister [12]
 Colin Grazier, Able Seaman RN was posthumously awarded the George Cross for the "for outstanding bravery and steadfast devotion to duty in the face of danger" that he displayed on 30 October 1942 in boarding, with Lieutenant Francis Fasson, the sinking U-559 and recovering 'short signal' codebooks which provided a breakthrough in Cryptanalysis of the German Naval Enigma but losing his life in the process
 Nigel de Grey, cryptologist, in World War I helped decrypt the Zimmermann Telegram
 Philip Hall
 John Herivel, arrived at Bletchley Park in January 1940; discoverer of the "Herivel Tip"; later worked in administration in the "Newmanry" (science historian)
 Peter Hilton, arrived at Bletchley Park in January 1942, worked in Hut 8 until late 1942, moved to Research Section to work on Fish, later in Testery (topologist)
 Harry Hinsley (historian) 
 James Hogarth, worked on German naval cyphers e.g. Reservehandverfahren
 Gwen Hollington, worked in Hut 4, Bletchley Park, translating decrypted German naval communications
 Leonard Hooper (Director of GCHQ) 
 Dorothy Hyson (American-born West End actress )
 John Jeffreys, supervised manufacture of perforated sheets; initially in charge of Hut 6 with Welchman until May 1940; died in early 1941 (mathematician)
 Roy Jenkins, codebreaker in the Testery (Labour Member of Parliament and government minister; first British President of the European Commission (1977–81); one of the four principal founders of the Social Democratic Party (SDP) in 1981, ennobled as Baron Jenkins of Hillhead; distinguished writer, especially of biographies)
 Jones, Sergeant (later Squadron Leader); given overall responsibility for Bombe maintenance by Travis.
 Daniel Jones, Japanese, Romanian and Russian codebreaker (Welsh composer)
 Eric Jones, head of Hut 3 (Director of GCHQ)
 Joan Joslin, cryptanalyst whose work helped lead to the sinking of the Scharnhorst
 Harold Keen, BTM engineer who built the British bombes
 Marjorie Jean Oswald Kennedy
 Dilly Knox, leading cryptologist, cracked the code of the commercial Enigma machines used in the Spanish Civil War, one of the British participants in the conference in which the Poles disclosed to their French and British allies their achievements in Enigma decryption, broke the Abwehr non-steckered Enigma
 Solomon Kullback, American mathematician and cryptologist who visited Bletchley Park in May 1942 and cooperated with the British in the solution of more conventional German codebook-based systems. Shortly after his return to the US, Kullback moved into the Japanese section as its chief, and later joined the National Security Agency.
 Leslie Lambert (short story writer as A. J. Alan)
 Peter Laslett
 Hugh Last (Professor of Ancient History at Brasenose College, Oxford)
 F. L. ("Peter") Lucas, Hut 3 1939–45, translator and intelligence-analyst, acting head Hut 3, C.O. BP Home Guard (writer; lecturer in literature, King's College, Cambridge)
 Arnold Lynch
 Sir John Marriott (philatelist)
 Peter Marr-Johnston headed Wireless Experimental Centre, Delhi; British Army officer.
 Victor Masters, Testery shift-leader and senior codebreaker
 George McVittie OBE, Air Section, Head of Meteorological Sub-section. (Professor of Astronomy at the University of Illinois)
 Stewart Menzies, non-operational Director of GC&CS (head of Secret Intelligence Service)
 Donald Michie, joined BP in the early summer of 1942' later worked with Colossus; had the idea for modifying it to become Colossus II, which could tackle 'wheel patterns' in addition to 'wheel settings'
 Stuart Milner-Barry, member of Hut 6 from early 1940 to the end of the war; head of Hut 6 from Autumn 1943 (chess player and civil servant) 
 Max Newman, head of the "Newmanry" (topologist)
 Brinley ("Bryn") Newton-John (father of Olivia Newton-John)
 Rolf Noskwith, cryptographer
 Wilfrid Noyce, wartime Intelligence Officer, cryptanalyst (climber, 1953 Mt Everest expedition; knew Alan Turing)
 Denis Oswald, linguist and senior codebreaker
 Thaddeus ("Teddy") Pilley, RAF Intelligence Officer, linguist in Hut 3 (was made Officier d’Academie by France; helped found the International Association of Conference Interpreters and the Institute of Linguists; founded and ran the Linguists' Club)
 John H. Plumb
 Howard Newton Porter, US Army (philologist, Yale classics instructor, professor of classics at Columbia University)
 Lewis Franklin Powell, Jr., US Army (member of the US Supreme Court)
 F.T. Prince (poet)
 Henry Reed, translator (poet and radio dramatist)
 David Rees, Hut 6 (mathematician)
 Marian Rejewski, Polish mathematician and cryptologist
 Grafton Melville Richards, ISOS, cryptographer, linguist and academic (Welsh and Celtic Studies). Author of Welsh language novel Y Gelyn Mewnol (The Enemy Within), (1943), Llandybie: Llyfrau'r Dryw. 
 Jerry Roberts, Testery shift-leader, linguist and senior codebreaker
 James Robertson, Blocks A and F, Air Section. Ran BP Recreational Club Choral Society (Director of the Sadler's Wells Opera Company)
 Alison Robins, Wren
 Margaret Rock, mathematician
 Jim Rose, Hut 3, later journalist and campaigner 
 Pamela Rose, Hut 4 and Naval records, earlier actress, later school counsellor and charity chair 
 Bob Roseveare, Hut 6 (schoolteacher)
 Miriam Louisa Rothschild, author and scientist 
 Mair Russell-Jones, cryptanalyst in Hut 6, working on the Enigma cipher.
 John Saltmarsh (historian)
 D. R. Shackleton Bailey
 Anne Segrave  (née Anne Hamilton-Grace; was indexer in Hut 3.in 1942,43, worked under F.L. Lucas, then Lavers; received a proposal of marriage from Ralph Tymms) 
 Arthur Shaw (cryptographer); RN, at the Far East Combined Bureau, founder and head of diplomatic section. 
 Edward H. Simpson, cryptanalyst and mathematical statistician
 Admiral Hugh Sinclair, non-operational Director of GC&CS (head of Secret Intelligence Service)
 Howard Smith (director general of MI5)
 Francis Hayward Stanton
 Rosemary Brown Stanton
 Oliver Strachey, head of the section deciphering Abwehr messages
 Alan Stripp, worked on Japanese codes (author of Codebreaker in the Far East)
 Sadie Stuart
 Joy Tamblin (Director of the Women's Royal Air Force)
 Derek Taunt, arrived in Bletchley Park in August 1941, worked in Hut 6 (mathematician, later bursar of Jesus College, Cambridge)
 Telford Taylor, US Army (Counsel for the Prosecution at the Nuremberg Trials)
 Ralph Tester, linguist, head of the Testery and member of a TICOM team (accountant with Unilever)
 John Thompson, codebreaker
 John Tiltman
 Edward Travis
 Michael Trumm
 Alan Turing, mathematician, logician, cryptanalyst, designer of the bombe, head of Hut 8 (pioneering computer scientist)
 W. T. Tutte
 Peter Twinn, first British cryptographer to read a German military Enigma message; became the head of the Abwehr Enigma section
 Ralph Tymms  
 Jean Valentine, leading WRNS, Bombe operator
 Langdon Van Norden, US Army Signal Corps (chairman of the board of the Metropolitan Opera Association)
 Vernon Watkins
 Neil Leslie Webster, major in SIXTA, signals intelligence and codebreaking
 Peter Frederick West Maintained the Bombes at Bletchley Park. 
 Gordon Welchman, initially in charge of Hut 6 with Jeffreys, became official head of the section until Autumn 1943; later Assistant Director of Mechanisation at Bletchley Park (author of The Hut Six Story, worked on secure communications systems for US forces)
 J. H. C. Whitehead, Newmanry mathematician (topologist, one of the founders of homotopy theory) 
Bernard Willson, academic, worked in Hut 4 on Italian and Japanese codes
 Angus Wilson (novelist and short story writer)
 F. W. Winterbotham, RAF Intelligence Officer, responsible for devising SLU system for secure dissemination of Ultra (author of The Ultra Secret) 
 Shaun Wylie, arrived at Bletchley in February 1941, head of crib section in Hut 8, transferred in Autumn 1943 to work on Tunny (topologist, mathematics lecturer at Cambridge, and head of mathematics at GCHQ)
 C. E. Wynn-Williams (physicist from the TRE; designed the electronic counters used in the Newmanry's Robinson machines and Colossus computers
 Leslie Yoxall, Hut 8, devised Yoxallismus technique
Joan Louisa McLean, Leading Wren 45270, wartime morse code operator

See also
List of women in Bletchley Park
See Hut 7 for a list of those associated with Japanese codes and either the Far East Combined Bureau or Wireless Experimental Centre in the Far East.

References

Further reading
 'Buckinghamshire Spies and Subversives' by DJ Kelly (May 2015) see ch. 13
 

Lists of British people
Bl
 
Lists of World War II veterans
Bletchley Park
Lists of English people by location